Oriel Domínguez (born 4 July 1953) is a Cuban water polo player. He competed at the 1976 Summer Olympics and the 1980 Summer Olympics.

References

External links
 

1953 births
Living people
Cuban male water polo players
Olympic water polo players of Cuba
Water polo players at the 1976 Summer Olympics
Water polo players at the 1980 Summer Olympics
Place of birth missing (living people)